Kathua district is one of 20 administrative districts that comprise the Indian union territory of Jammu and Kashmir. It is surrounded by Jammu to the northwest, the Doda and Udhampur districts to the north, the state of Himachal Pradesh to the east, Punjab to the south, and Pakistan's working boundary to the west. Its terrain is diverse, consisting of rich agricultural areas along the Punjab/Kashmir border, plains sweeping eastward to the foothills of the Himalaya, and the mountainous Pahari region in the east..

Kathua district is divided into 8 blocks: Bani, Barnoti, Basholi, Billawar, Duggan, Ghagwal, Hiranagar, Kathua and Lohai Malhar. It has approximately 512 villages.

The traditional language of Kathua is Dogri. Pahari languages are prevalent in the mountainous area of the east. The principal media of education are English, Hindi, and Urdu.

History

Jodh Singh of the Andotra clan(shares ancestry with Tomar and Som Rajputs) is believed to have migrated from Hastinapur to [Kathua] nearly 2,000 years ago.

His three sons established the three Hamlets of Taraf Tajwal, Taraf Manjali and Taraf Bhajwal. Their descendants are now called as Tajwalia, Bhajwalia and Khanwalia Rajputs of ANDOTRA sub-caste.
Prior to 1921, the Kathua district was known as the Jasrota district. Between 1921–1931, the headquarters of the district was shifted to Kathua without any alteration in the area of governance.

Greek historians, who provide an insight into the ancient history of Jammu hills, prominently record the existence in this area of two powerful empires - Abhisara (present day Poonch) and Kathaioi - at the time of invasion of India by Alexander.  Strabo describes Kathaioi as a mighty republic of that era,  located in the foothills along the Ravi River. The topography of Kathaioi corresponds with the present day Kathua. Strabo describes the people of this republic as the epitome of bravery and courage, and records that they gave a tough fight to invading army of Alexander.

There are many places which commemorate a visit to Kathua by Pandavas. Lord Krishna is also said to have come to this area, in order to get back from Jamawant the Syamantaka Mani.

Because of its close proximity to the Pakistan border, Kathua District has had a significant Indian Army presence since independence.  The Army units were camped at Kathua during militancy in the state when the ultras (extremists) carried out attacks against government installations.  Some of these ultras were Lashkar-e-Taiba (LeT) and infiltration across the border from Pakistan was a major concern.  There were many attacks in the region beginning in the late 1980s. Among them, in 2002, in March ten people were killed in an attack in Kathua at a temple, in May thirty-two people were killed in an attack on a bus and Army residential complex, in July twenty-nine people were killed in an attack near Qasim Nagar, in September twelve people were killed when ultras attacked a bus at Hiranagar Morh.  In 2005, three terrorists attacked on army camp in front of District Hospital in Kathua killing two people. By 2008 the attacks had ceased. But in 2013, ultras attacked a police station, killing four policemen and a civilian, stole a truck and then attacked an army camp in the neighboring Samba District.

Basohli Paintings

Basohli, a town of Kathua district, is widely known for its paintings. Immortalised by their artistic eminences and their connoisseur patrons, Basohli today is a metaphor for a vigorous, bold and imaginative artistic style, rich, stylish and unconventional.

A style of painting characterized by vigorous use of primary colours and a peculiar facial formula prevailed in the seventeenth and early eighteenth centuries in the foothills of the Western Himalayas in the Jammu and Punjab States.

The earliest paintings in this style originated in Basohli from where the style spread to the Hill States of Mankot, Nurpur, Kulu, Mandi, Suket, Bilaspur, Nalagarh, Chamba, Guler and Kangra.  The first mention of Basohli painting is in the annual report of the Archaeological Survey of India published in 1921.

Administration
Kathua is divided into four subdivisions: Bani, Basohli, Billawar/Badnota, and Hiranagar. These sub-divisions are further divided into 11 tehsils:
 Kathua
 Hiranagar
 Billawar
 Basohli
 Bani
 Nagri
 Marheen
 Dinga Amb
 Mahanpur
 Lohai Malhar
 Ramkote

Politics
Kathua District has five assembly constituencies: Bani, Basohli, Kathua, Billawar and Hiranagar (S.C).

Demographics

According to the 2011 census Kathua district has a population of 616,435, roughly equal to the nation of Solomon Islands or the US state of Vermont. This gives it a ranking of 521st in India (out of a total of 640). Its population growth rate over the decade 2001-2011 was  20.53%. Kathua has a sex ratio of 890 females for every 1000 males, and a literacy rate of 73.09%.

At the time of the 2011 census, 81.92% of the population spoke Dogri, 6.94% Pahari, 3.50% Gojri, 2.01% Kashmiri, 1.86% Punjabi and 1.03% Hindi as their first language.

See also
Jasrota
Jasrotia

References

External links
 Kathua district, Official website
 Kathua district on OpenStreetMap
 Gallery for Basohli paintings

 
Districts of Jammu and Kashmir